Saint Stephen the Protomartyr Church of New Julfa, (Armenian: ,), is an Armenian Apostolic church in New Julfa, Iran. It is located in Hakopjan neighbourhood of New Julfa.

History 

Saint Stephen Church was built in 1614 and is the largest church in New Julfa. There is a chapel by the name of St. Mary in the church. Between 1830 and 1890, there was a school in the church courtyard, named Holy Saviour School. There is tombstone of Manouk, son of Khoja Melkom, who was killed by Afghans in 1722 during the Siege of Isfahan.

See also
Iranian Armenians
List of Armenian churches in Iran

References 

Architecture in Iran
Churches in Isfahan
Armenian Apostolic churches in Iran
Oriental Orthodox congregations established in the 17th century
Tourist attractions in Isfahan